In Norway, a number of main lines were in the 19th century built with narrow gauge, to save cost in a sparsely populated mountainous country. This included Norway's first own long-distance line, the Røros Line, connecting Oslo and Trondheim, 1877. Some secondary railways also had this gauge. These railways have been rebuilt to standard gauge or closed down. Some private railways had  and one had . A few railways partly still are operated as museum railways, specifically the Thamshavn Line, Urskog–Høland Line and the Setesdal Line. The Trondheim Tramway is also narrow gauge.

List of narrow-gauge lines

References

Railway lines in Norway